John Edward Barrett (15 October 1866 in South Melbourne – 6 February 1916 at Peak Hill, Western Australia) was an Australian cricketer who played two Tests in 1890. He worked as a medical doctor.

Life and career

Barrett was educated at Wesley College in Melbourne before going on to Melbourne University to study medicine. His father was a doctor in South Melbourne, and his older brother was also a doctor.

A careful batsman, reliable in a crisis, Jack Barrett played first-class cricket for Victoria from 1885 to 1893. Despite having missed many of Victoria's matches owing to his medical studies, he was selected to tour England in 1890 with the Australian team.

On his Test debut, in the first Test of the series at Lord's, Barrett became the first Australian batsman to carry his bat in Test cricket. In the second innings he opened the innings and batted for 280 minutes and scored 67 not out of a team total of 176. On the tour as a whole he was second in the Australian batting averages with 1305 runs at 22.89. According to A. G. Moyes, he "did a splendid job, showing unlimited patience and splendid defence, though he lacked grace and charm in technique to relieve the monotony". He made his highest first-class score of 97 (and 73 not out in the second innings) in the final match of the tour against an England XI at Manchester.

In addition to his cricketing skills, Barrett was also a leading Australian rules footballer, playing for South Melbourne in the late 1880s and early 1890s, topping the Victorian Football Association (VFA) goal kicking in 1889 with 40 goals.

Barrett undertook further medical studies in England after the cricket tour, earning an MRCS diploma in surgery. He retired from cricket at the age of 26 to pursue his medical career. At the time of his death in the goldfields town of Peak Hill, Western Australia, he had been practising there for some years.

See also
 List of Victoria first-class cricketers

References

External links

Sources

 Atkinson, G. (1982) Everything you ever wanted to know about Australian rules football but couldn't be bothered asking, The Five Mile Press: Melbourne. .

1866 births
1916 deaths
People educated at Wesley College (Victoria)
Melbourne Medical School alumni
Australia Test cricketers
Victoria cricketers
Australian cricketers
South Melbourne Football Club (VFA) players
Cricketers from Melbourne
Australian rules footballers from Victoria (Australia)
C. I. Thornton's XI cricketers
A. J. Webbe's XI cricketers